Jens Dall Bentzen  (born 18 April 1968 in Aalborg) is a Danish engineer.

Bentzen studied Thermodynamics and Engineering at the Technical University of Denmark in Copenhagen. Bentzen made a master's degree in gasification of biomass in 1995. After his master's degree Bentzen worked as a researcher at the Technical University, developing a new gascleaning system for biomass gasification based on use of baghouse filtration.

Between 1998-2007 Bentzen worked for the major Danish consulting company COWI . Bentzen continued to co-operate with the Technical University, about optimizing and upscale of the gasification technology. In 2000 Bentzen filed a patent about the upscale high efficient gasification process (patent number WO 01/68789 A1). In 2004 was a licensagreement between COWI and a Danish boiler manufacturer. Between 2005-2008 was a pilot plant of the gasification process built and tested. Between 2009-2013 was a full scale demonstration plant built in Hillerød. 

In 2006 Bentzen made a new invention about increased efficiency of biomass combustion plants, and a patent application was made (Patent number WO 2007/036236 A1). After negotiations with COWI and potential partners mr. Bentzen founded Dall Energy in 2007, with seed investment from Spraying Systems, and bought the patent application from COWI.

Since 2007 Bentzen have been managing director of Dall Energy. In 2011 Bentzen achieved the European Inventor Award as the first Dane ever. In 2017 Bentzen achieved the Blue tech award in China.

Innovation Awards
2010 - Innovation Award. Biomass conference in Valladolid, Spain.
2011 - European Inventor Award in the category SMEs awarded by the European Patent Office
2011 - Clean tech price. Danish Environmental Agency.
2017 - Blue tech award. China

External links
Homepage of Dall Energy
European Inventor Award 2011
Feature in CNN International

1968 births
Living people
Danish engineers
European Inventor Award winners
Technical University of Denmark alumni